Lord MacDonell refers to the Lordship of MacDonell in the Jacobite Peerage. On 9 December 1716, Alastair MacDonell of Glengarry, with remainder to his heirs male, was created by James VIII & III a Lord and Peer of Parliament as Lord Macdonell. The current holder of the title is Aeneas Ranald Euan Macdonell, 13th Lord MacDonell, 23rd titular chief of Macdonell of Glengarry.

Lords
Alastair MacDonell, or MacDonald, 11th Chief of Glengarry, 1st Lord MacDonell, attainted 1690, fought at Sherriffmuir, again attainted 1716, died 1724.
John MacDonell, 2nd Lord MacDonell, 12th Chief of Glengarry, son of 1st Lord, died 1754.
Alastair MacDonell, 3rd Lord MacDonell, 13th Chief of Glengarry, son of 2nd Lord, died 1761.
Duncan MacDonell, 4th Lord MacDonell, 14th Chief of Glengarry, son of 3rd Lord, died 11 July 1788.
Alexander Ranaldson MacDonell, 5th Lord MacDonell, 15th Chief of Glengarry, son of 4th Lord, born 15 September 1771, died 17 January 1828.
Aeneas Ranaldson MacDonell, 6th Lord MacDonell, 16th Chief of Glengarry, son of 5th Lord, born 29 July 1808, died 19 June 1852.
Alexander Ranaldson MacDonell, 7th Lord MacDonell, 17th Chief of Glengarry, elder son of 6th Lord, born 1834, died 2 June 1862.
Charles Ranaldson MacDonell, 8th Lord MacDonell, 18th Chief of Glengarry, 3rd son of 6th Lord, born 1838, died June 1868.
Aeneas Ranald MacDonell, 9th Lord MacDonell, a descendant of the next younger brother of the 1st Lord, and a member of the Madras Civil Service, born 1790, died October 1868.
Aeneas Ranald Westrop MacDonell, 10th Lord MacDonell, grandson of 9th Lord, born in India 5 December 1847, died in London 2 January 1901.
Aeneas Ranald MacDonell, 11th Lord MacDonell, CBE, born Sevenoaks, Kent, 8 August 1875, emigrated to Ceylon, died 1941.
Air Commodore Aeneas Ranald Donald MacDonell CB DFC RAF, 12th Lord MacDonell, born Baku, Russian Empire, 15 November 1913, died 1 June 1999.
Aeneas Ranald Euan MacDonell, 13th Lord MacDonell, born 11 November 1941, educated at Bryanston and St John's College, Cambridge, Director of London & Scandinavian Metallurgical Co. Limited.

References

Clan Donald
Lordships of Parliament in the Jacobite peerage